This is a partial list of the equipment of the Irish Army, the land component of the Irish Defence Forces.

Weapons 
While the Army Ranger Wing has access to a wider variety of specialist weapons, the modern weapons in use within the Irish Army includes the following:

Vehicles 
This is a partial list of the modern vehicles in use within the Irish Army.

Defence Forces aircraft 
Note: All Irish Aircraft are operated by the Irish Air Corps. Main article: List of aircraft of the Irish Air Corps

Gallery

See also 
 Modern Irish Army uniform
 Armoured fighting vehicles of the Irish Army

References 

Modern equipment of the Irish Army
 
Ireland